David Hayman (born 9 February 1948) is a Scottish film, television and stage actor and director. He appeared in Hope and Glory, Rob Roy, Sid and Nancy, Vertical Limit, and The Tailor of Panama. On television, he is known for playing Mike Walker in ITV drama Trial & Retribution, Jonas Franks in BBC period drama The Paradise and Brace in the drama Taboo.

Life and career

Hayman was born in Bridgeton, Glasgow, Scotland. After studying at the Royal Scottish Academy of Music and Drama in Glasgow, he began his acting career at the Citizens Theatre in the city. At the venue, Hayman played roles such as Hamlet, the lead in Beaumarchais' The Marriage of Figaro and Al Capone. He gained national prominence playing the role of the notorious Barlinnie Prison convict turned sculptor, Jimmy Boyle, in the television film A Sense of Freedom (1981).

After this film for television, Hayman focused on performing character roles rather than the lead. His long list of film credits include appearances supporting Gary Oldman in Sid and Nancy (1986), Bruce Willis in The Jackal (1997), Kevin Spacey in Ordinary Decent Criminal (2000) and Pierce Brosnan in The Tailor of Panama (2001). He also appeared in Hope and Glory (1987), directed by John Boorman, as well as The Boy in the Striped Pyjamas (2008).

Hayman is known for his role as Chief Supt. Michael Walker in Lynda La Plante's long-running crime thriller Trial & Retribution, which ran for twelve series from 1997 to 2009. He has a distinct scar over his left eye, which he chose to use as character makeup, along with a shaved head, for his part in the series.

Hayman has also had success in directing film and TV productions. Silent Scream (1990) is a study of convicts in Barlinnie Prison, examining the life of convicted murderer Larry Winters. The film was entered into the 40th Berlin International Film Festival. Later followed The Hawk (1993), starring Helen Mirren as a woman who begins to suspect that her husband is a serial killer. He was also in The Near Room, a film about child abuse and corruption set in Glasgow.

In 2009, Hayman appeared in an episode of the BBC series Robin Hood. In September 2011, Hayman hosted a documentary reconstructing the unsolved murders of Glasgow serial killer Bible John, who murdered three young woman in the late 1960s. The documentary was named In Search of Bible John, and looked at the evidence which links Peter Tobin to the killings.

In 2012, Hayman played the Earl of Worcester in the BBC2 adaptation of Henry IV, Part I.

On stage, Hayman appeared as Chris in the 2011 production of Eugene O'Neill's  Anna Christie at the Donmar Theatre, London. In 2012, he returned to the Citizens Theatre in Glasgow to play the lead in King Lear alongside George Costigan.

In March 2014, Hayman presented a BBC Two documentary exploring how shipbuilding industry along the river Clyde and four resulting ships; Cutty Sark, CS Mackay-Bennett, CSS Robert E. Lee and HMS Hood helped shaped up the Commonwealth.

In July 2016, Hayman presented a BBC Two documentary highlighting Scapa Flow's key role in World War I.

In November 2018, Hayman presented a BBC One documentary telling the story of Captain Jack McCleery and his role, alongside his colleagues, in pioneering Royal Navy's naval aviation with their trial flight on HMS Furious and the subsequent Tondern raid.

Charity work and awards
Hayman was awarded the City of Glasgow's gold medal in 1992, for outstanding services to the performing arts. In 2001 he founded the humanitarian charity Spirit Aid which is dedicated to children of the world whose lives have been devastated by war, genocide, poverty, abuse or lack of opportunity at home and abroad. Hayman is currently Head of Operations of the charity which undertakes humanitarian relief projects from Kosovo to Guinea-Bissau, Afghanistan, Sri Lanka, Cambodia, Malawi and South Africa.

Personal life
David Hayman has three sons: David Jr., Sammy, and Sean.

Filmography

Acting

Just Your Luck (1972, TV Series) as Alec
Axe (1974) as Radio and Television Shows (voice)
The Eagle of the Ninth (1977, TV Mini-Series) as Liathan
Scotch & Wry (1978, TV Series)
Time of the Eagle (1979)
A Sense of Freedom (1979) as Jimmy Boyle
Enemy at the Door (1980, TV Series) as Oberleutnant Hellman
Eye of the Needle (1981) as Canter
Ill Fares The Land (1982)
Fame Is the Spur (1982, TV Mini-Series) as Arnold Ryerson
Coming Out of the Ice (1982, TV Movie) as Guard Commander 1
Love Story: Mr. Right (1983, TV Series)
It'll All Be Over in Half an Hour (1983, TV Series)
Reilly: The Ace of Spies (1983, TV Mini-Series) as Von Jaegar
Fell Tiger (1985, TV Mini-Series) as Joe Borrow
Murphy's Law (1986) as Jack
Sid and Nancy (1986) as Malcolm McLaren
Heavenly Pursuits (1986) as Jeff Jeffries
Hope and Glory (1987) as Clive
Walker (1987) as Father Rossiter
Venus Peter (1989) as Kinnear
Silent Scream (1990) as PO 4 - Barlinnie Prison Staff
Grave Secrets: The Legacy of Hilltop Drive (1992, TV Movie) as Plumber
Underbelly (1992, TV Series) as Stephen Crowe
Between the Lines (1993, TV Series) as David Lindsay
Finney (1994, TV Series) as McDade
Ghosts (1995, TV Series) as Les Rudkin
Rob Roy (1995) as Sibbald
The Near Room (1995) as Dougie Patterson
Braveheart (1995) as McCallachan
The Short Walk (1995, Short) as Captain
Smilla's Sense of Snow (1997) as Telling
Twin Town (1997) as Dodgy
Regeneration (1997) as Maj. Bryce
The Jackal (1997) as Terek Murad
The Boxer (1997) as Joe Hamill's Aide
Friendly Voices (1997, Short) as Alec
Trial & Retribution (1997-2009, TV Series) as Det. Supt. Michael Walker
Getting Hurt (1998, TV Movie) as Corvin
My Name Is Joe (1998) as McGowan
Legionnaire (1998) as Recruiting Sergeant
The Lost Son (1999) as Nathalie's Pimp
The Match (1999) as Scrapper
Ordinary Decent Criminal (2000) as Tony Brady
Last Orders (2000, Short)
Best (2000) as Tommy Dougherty / The Barman
Vertical Limit (2000) as Frank 'Chainsaw' Williams
The Tailor of Panama (2001) as Luxmore
Murder Rooms: The Photographer's Chair (2001, TV Mini-Series) as Mitchell
The Last Great Wilderness (2002) as Ruaridh
As the Beast Sleeps (2002, TV Movie) as Alec
The Wild Dogs (2002) as Victor
Tough Love (2002, TV Movie) as Barry Hindes
Still Game (2002, TV Series) as Vince
Gifted (2003, TV Movie) as Michael Sanderson
De drabbade (2003, TV Mini-Series) as Häxjägaren
Gladiatress (2004) as General Rhinus
Fuse (2004, Short) as Lem
Where the Truth Lies (2005) as Reuben
Rag Tale (2005) as Picture Editor - The Rag, Geoff (P3) Randal
A Shot in the West (2006, Short) as Henry Wynn
Small Engine Repair (2006) as Jesse Gold
Speed Dating (2007) as Doctor Birmingham
Flood (2007) as Major General Ashcroft
Unknown Things (2007) as Dr MacGregor
The Boy in the Striped Pyjamas (2008) as Pavel
The Promise (2008)
Wasted (2009, TV Series) as Joe
Lewis (2009, TV Series) as Richie Maguire
Robin Hood (2009, TV Series) as Abbott
Burke & Hare (2010) as Danny McTavish
Screwed (2011) as Keenan
Birthday (2011) as Prison Warden
Top Boy (2011-2013, TV Series) as Joe
In Search of Bible John (September 2011, TV Series)
Sawney: Flesh of Man (2012) as Sawney Bean
The Domino Effect (2012) as Robert
Henry IV, Part I (2012, TV Series)
The Paradise (2012-2013, TV Series) as Jonas Franks
The Field of Blood (2013, TV Series) as Red Willie McDade
Jack Ryan: Shadow Recruit (2014) as Ambassador Sergey Dostal
Shetland (2014, TV Series) TV as Joe Dalhousie
Queen and Country (2014) as Clive Rohan
Castles in the Sky (2014) as Frederick Lindemann
New Tricks (2014, TV Series) as Ralph Paxton
Macbeth (2015) as Lennox
Dartmoor Killing (2015) as Tom
Viceroy's House (2017) as Ewart
Taboo (2017, TV Series) as Brace
Finding Your Feet (2017) as Ted
Two Graves (2018) as Tommy
The Break (2018)
Dirt Road to Lafayette (2018) as Uncle John
Blinded by the Light (2019) as Mr Evans
Fisherman's Friends (2019) as Jago
The Corrupted (2019) as DCI Raymond Ellery
Dad's Army: The Lost Episodes (2019, TV Series) as Private Frazer
Our Ladies (2019)
 The Nest (2020) as Souter
 Bull (2021) as Norm
Landscapers (2021) as William Wycherley
Doc Martin (2022) as George
Andor (TV Series) (2022) as Chieftain
The Walk-In (2022) as Older Lenny

Directing
Silent Scream (1990)
Firm Friends (1992) TV
Black and Blue (1992) TV
A Woman's Guide to Adultery (1993) TV
The Hawk (1993)
Cardiac Arrest (1994) TV
Finney (1994) TV
The Near Room (1995)
Harbour Lights (1999) TV

Presenter
Clydebuilt: The Ships That Made The Commonwealth (documentary series) (2014) TV
Scotland's War at Sea (documentary series) (2016) TV
The Battle for Scotland's Countryside (documentary) (2018) TV
Hayman's Way (documentary series) (2020) TV
Wonders of Scotland with David Hayman (documentary series) (2021) TV

Selected theatreAnna Christie (2011) – Donmar Theatre, LondonKing Lear (2012) – Citizens Theatre, GlasgowCyprus Avenue'' (2023) - Tron Theatre, Glasgow

References

External links

Spirit Aid home page

1948 births
Living people
Male actors from Glasgow
People from Bridgeton, Glasgow
Film people from Glasgow
Alumni of the Royal Conservatoire of Scotland
Scottish male film actors
Scottish film directors
Scottish male stage actors
Scottish male television actors